Golubić is a village located 9 km north of Knin, in the continental part of Šibenik-Knin County, Croatia. It is situated along the Krka.

The Golubić Hydroelectric Power Plant exists at the Butižnica river.

History
Gold jewellery dating to the beginning of the 7th century have been found, as well as an early Croatian graveyard and the fragments of church furniture dating to the 9th or 10th century, near the St. Stephen Orthodox church.

The Orthodox Church of St. Stephen was built in 1462. In 1692, it served as the seat of the Dalmatian bishop Vasilije I. In 1774, Serbian philosopher Dositej Obradović was a teacher in the village.

During the Croatian War of Independence, the village was held by Serb troops, which established military camp led by Dragan Vasiljković, suspected for maltreatments of Croatian captives in Knin camp. After the fall of Serbian Krajina, most Serbs left the village, and Bosnian Croats settled here.

At least 19 Serb civilians from the village were massacred on 6 August 1995 during the Croatian Army's Operation Storm. A monument was built outside the church commemorating the victims and it contains the names of 34 people killed during the war. On October 2, 2011, the Croatian government issued a ban on a commemoration gathering, ordering the church to remove the monument as "two thirds of the place that the monument was built on belong to the state and that only one third belongs to the Serbian Orthodox Church (SPC)." and "the ban has removed danger of bigger incidents and unrest".

Demographics

1961 census, total 2243 people.
1971 census, total 1885 people.
1981 census, total 1617 people.
1991 census, total 1424 people. 1389 Serbs, 17 Croats, 1 Yugoslav, 1 Muslim, 16 others.
2001 census, total 654 people. 
2011 census, total 132 people.

Notable people 
 Zdravko Ponoš, former Chief of the General Staff of the Serbian Armed Forces

References

Populated places in Šibenik-Knin County
Archaeological sites in Croatia
Knin